Kruopiai  is a small town in Šiauliai County in northern-central Lithuania. As of 2011 it had a population of 508. It is the final resting place of Ann Wigmore, where a monument was unveiled in her honour on 22 September 2012.

References

This article was initially translated from the Lithuanian Wikipedia.

Akmenė District Municipality
Towns in Lithuania
Towns in Šiauliai County
Shavelsky Uyezd